The Manor of Santo António  is a Portuguese manor house situated along the regional roadway of the civil parish of Ribeira Seca (Calheta) in the municipality of Calheta, on the island of São Jorge, archipelago of the Azores.

Architecture

The manor house is made of black basalt stone, while its windows and doors are made with raised frames.

Over the main doorway of the manor house is the inscription "MASS 1822", dating the building's period of construction.

Attached to the manor house is the Hermitage of Santo António, which was constructed in 1816.

References 
 

Buildings and structures in Calheta, Azores
Santo Antonio